Jujubinus rafaemesai is a species of sea snail, a marine gastropod mollusk in the family Trochidae, the top snails.

Description

Distribution
This species occurs in the Atlantic Ocean off the Canary Islands.

References

 Rolán E. & Swinnen F. (2013) A new species of the genus Jujubinus from the Canary Islands (Gastropoda, Trochoidea, Trochidae). Gloria Maris 52(6): 172–177.

rafaemesai
Gastropods described in 2013